Luis "Junior" Pérez Ortiz (born September 5, 1955) is a Puerto Rican politician affiliated with the New Progressive Party (PNP). He has been a member of the Puerto Rico House of Representatives since 1998 representing District 7.

Early years and studies

Luis Pérez Ortiz was born on September 5, 1955 in Bayamón, Puerto Rico. He has four siblings.

Pérez studied at the Parcelas Van Scoy Elementary School, and continued in María Vázquez de Umpierre Junior High School. He completed high school at Dr. Agustín Stahl High School in Bayamón. He has taken several courses in Business Administration.

Professional career

Pérez began working from a young age. He worked for more than 12 years in various private companies like Belk Lindsey, Almacénes Gonzalo Rivera, and Holsum Bakers of Puerto Rico.

Public service

In 1985, Pérez began serving as Planning Official for the Civil Defense. He later worked as Director of the Tomás Kuilan Public Transportation Terminal in Bayamón. In September 1987, he became Director of the Municipal Civil Defense. In 1997, the Mayor of Bayamón, Ramón Luis Rivera, appointed Pérez as Director of the Public Safety Department of Bayamón.

Political career

In 1998, Pérez decided to run for a seat in the House of Representatives of Puerto Rico representing District 7. He has been reelected to that position four times (2000, 2004, 2008, 2012).

Personal life

Pérez has been married since 1978. He has three children.

References

External links
Luis Pérez Ortiz Official biography
Luis Pérez Ortiz Profile on WAPA-TV

Living people
1955 births
New Progressive Party members of the House of Representatives of Puerto Rico
People from Bayamón, Puerto Rico